The Short Creek raid was an Arizona Department of Public Safety and Arizona National Guard action against Mormon fundamentalists that took place on the morning of July 26, 1953, at Short Creek, Arizona. The Short Creek raid was the largest mass arrest of polygamists in American history. At the time, it was described as "the largest mass arrest of men and women in modern American history."

Events
Just before dawn on July 26, 1953, 102 Arizona officers of public safety and soldiers from the Arizona National Guard entered Short Creek. The community—which was composed of approximately 400 Mormon fundamentalists—had been tipped off about the planned raid and were found singing hymns in the schoolhouse while the children played outside. The entire community was taken into custody, with the exception of six individuals who were found not to be fundamentalist Mormons. Among those taken into custody were 263 children. One hundred and fifty of the children who were taken into custody were not permitted to return to their parents for more than two years, and some parents never regained custody of their children.

Public and media reaction
Arizona Governor John Howard Pyle initially called the raid "a momentous police action against insurrection" and described the Mormon fundamentalists as participating in "the foulest conspiracy you could possibly imagine" that was designed to produce "white slaves." More than 100 reporters had been invited by Pyle to accompany the police to observe the raid. However, the raid and its tactics attracted mostly negative media attention; one newspaper editorialized:

By what stretch of the imagination could the actions of the Short Creek children be classified as insurrection? Were those teenagers playing volleyball in a school yard inspiring a rebellion? Insurrection? Well, if so, an insurrection with diapers and volleyballs! 

In the same week that the Korean War Armistice Agreement was signed, the raid achieved notoriety in media across the United States, including articles in Time and Newsweek, with many media outlets describing the raid as "odious" or "un-American." One commentator has suggested that commentary on the raid was "probably the first time in history that American polygamists had received media coverage that was largely sympathetic." Another has suggested that the raid's "only American parallel is the federal actions against Native Americans in the nineteenth century."

When Pyle lost his bid for re-election in 1954 to Democratic candidate Ernest McFarland, Pyle blamed the fallout from the raid as having destroyed his political career.

Support from The Church of Jesus Christ of Latter-day Saints
One of the few media outlets to applaud the raid was the Salt Lake City-based Deseret News, which was owned by the Church of Jesus Christ of Latter-day Saints (LDS Church). The News applauded the action as a needed response to prevent the fundamentalists from becoming "a cancer of a sort that is beyond hope of human repair." When the paper later editorialized its support for separating children from their polygamist parents, there was a backlash against the paper and the church by a number of Latter-day Saints, including Juanita Brooks, who complained that the church organization was approving of "such a basically cruel and wicked thing as the taking of little children from their mother." The Short Creek raid was the last action against polygamous Mormon fundamentalists that has been actively supported by the LDS Church.

Aftermath
After the Short Creek raid, the fundamentalist Mormon polygamist colony at Short Creek eventually rejuvenated. Short Creek was renamed Colorado City in 1960. In 1991, the Mormon fundamentalists at Colorado City formally established the Fundamentalist Church of Jesus Christ of Latter Day Saints (FLDS Church). The members of the sect did not face any prosecutions for its polygamous behavior until the late 1990s, when isolated individuals began to be prosecuted. In 2006, FLDS Church leader Warren Jeffs was placed on the FBI Ten Most Wanted List; he was arrested in 2007 and in 2011 was convicted in Texas of two counts of child sexual abuse and sentenced to life in prison.

On 3 April 2008, following allegations of physical and sexual abuse by an unidentified caller who claimed to be a 16-year-old girl, law enforcement officers raided a FLDS compound Jeffs had founded in Texas called the YFZ Ranch. As of 8 April, a total of 416 children had been removed from the compound by authorities. A former member of the FLDS Church, Carolyn Jessop, arrived on-site 6 April and stated her opinion that the action in Texas was unlike the Short Creek raid. Others, however, have drawn direct connections between the two events.

See also

Joseph White Musser: Mormon fundamentalist leader during the raid
Hildale, Utah
Short Creek Community

References

Further reading

External links
 
 Police raid Arizona polygamist enclave, a special report by The Salt Lake Tribune – "[a]n historical account of a radio address given by Arizona Governor Howard Pyle shortly after the Short Creek raid in 1953."
 Photos From a Notorious 1953 Raid on a Polygamist Arizona Town – LIFE Magazine archive

Fundamentalist Church of Jesus Christ of Latter-Day Saints
History of Mohave County, Arizona
Latter Day Saint movement in Arizona
1953 in Arizona
1953 in Christianity
1953 crimes in the United States
July 1953 events in the United States
20th-century Mormonism
Crimes in Arizona
Imprisonment and detention in the United States
Mormon fundamentalism
Christianity and children
Apostolic United Brethren
Christianity and law in the 20th century
United States law and polygamy in Mormonism
Law enforcement in Arizona